John Bramston may refer to:
Sir John Bramston the Elder (1577–1654), English judge and Chief Justice of the King's Bench
Sir John Bramston the Younger (1611–1700), son of Sir John Bramston, the elder; barrister and Member of Parliament for Essex
John Bramston (priest) (1802–1889), vicar of Witham, Dean of Winchester, a descendant of the younger
Sir John Bramston (Australian politician) (1832–1921), barrister, Queensland politician and British colonial administrator

See also 
 John Bramston School, Witham, Essex